The Great Dictionary of Modern Chinese Dialects is a compendium of dictionaries for 42 local varieties of Chinese following a common format.
The individual dictionaries cover dialects spread across the dialect groups identified in the Language Atlas of China:

 Mandarin
 Northeastern Mandarin: Harbin dialect
 Ji–Lu Mandarin: Jinan dialect
 Jiao–Liao Mandarin: Muping dialect
 Central Plains Mandarin: Luoyang dialect, Wanrong dialect, Xi'an dialect, Xining dialect, Xuzhou dialect
 Lanyin Mandarin: Urumqi dialect, Yinchuan dialect
 Southwestern Mandarin: Chengdu dialect, Guiyang dialect, Liuzhou dialect, Wuhan dialect
 Lower Yangtze Mandarin: Nanjing dialect, Yangzhou dialect
 Jin: Taiyuan dialect, Xinzhou dialect
 Wu: Chongming dialect, Danyang dialect, Hangzhou dialect, Jinhua dialect, Ningbo dialect, Shanghai dialect, Suzhou dialect, Wenzhou dialect
 Hui: Jixi dialect
 Gan: Lichuan dialect, Nanchang dialect, Pingxiang dialect
 Xiang: Changsha dialect, Loudi dialect
 Min: Fuzhou dialect, Haikou dialect, Jian'ou dialect, Leizhou dialect, Xiamen dialect
 Yue: Dongguan dialect, Guangzhou dialect
 Hakka: Meixian dialect, Yudu dialect
 Pinghua: Nanning dialect
Each dictionary was prepared by specialists in the dialect, and opens with an introduction to the characteristics of the dialect.  The main body of each dictionary has between 7,000 and 10,000 entries.

References 

2002 non-fiction books
Chinese dictionaries
Varieties of Chinese
Dialectology